Pseudonympha arnoldi, or Arnold's brown, is a butterfly in the family Nymphalidae. It is found in north-eastern Zimbabwe. The habitat consists of damp spots in montane grassland.

Adults have been recorded in February.

References

Satyrini
Butterflies described in 1941
Endemic fauna of Zimbabwe
Butterflies of Africa